The national flag of Cuba consists of five alternating stripes (three blue and two white) and a red equilateral triangle at the hoist, within which is a white five-pointed star. It was designed in 1849 and officially adopted May 20, 1902. It is in the stars and stripes flag family.

History and symbolism
Fighting against the Spanish Crown with the rebel armies of Venezuela, Narciso López moved from his native Caracas to Havana, Cuba. His involvement in anti-colonial movements forced him into exile. In 1849, he moved to New York City, United States, where he continued to advocate for an independent Cuba.

The three blue stripes represent the three departments in which Cuba was divided at that time; the white, purity of the patriot cause; and the red triangle, a symbol of strength, constancy, and Mason influences (triangles are Masonic symbols for equality and were found in a number of other flags in the former Spanish empire).

The poet Miguel Teurbe Tolón designed the flag alongside López, based upon the story of López's vision. Emilia Teurbe Tolón, Miguel's wife, sewed the first flag. López and Tolón, together with José Aniceto Iznaga Borrell, his nephew José María Sánchez Iznaga, Cirilo Villaverde and Juan Manuel Macías, settled upon the final design for the flag of Cuba: two white stripes, three blue, a red triangle, and a lone star.

López used this same flag in 1850 to carry out his coup attempt to liberate Cuba from Spanish rule, which resulted in failure. The coastal town of Cárdenas was the first town that saw the lone star flag hoisted on May 19, 1850, in the taking of the city by Cuban rebels.

A year after the start of the Ten Years' War, the first Constituent Assembly of the Republic of Cuba met arms in Guáimaro, Camagüey Province. The debate focused on two flags of great symbolism, the Demajagua – which was very similar to the Chilean flag – created by Carlos Manuel de Céspedes to give start to the war of independence, and the Lone Star of López, the latter being chosen since López had taken the first step for the freedom of Cuba. The Demajagua flag was not scrapped, but instead, was put in the sessions of the House of Representatives and retained as part of the national treasure.

On the morning of May 20, 1902, the day Cuba officially became an independent republic, Generalissimo Máximo Gómez had the honor of hoisting the flag on the flagpole of the castles of the Tres Reyes del Morro, Havana; therefore sealing with this act the end of the Cuban revolution, the end of struggle for Cuban independence, and at the same time justifying the sacrifice that so many offered to make this dream become reality.

Both the flag and the coat of arms were designed by Miguel Teurbe Tolón. The design of both specifications were established by decree of the first president of Cuba, Tomás Estrada Palma, on April 21, 1906. The flag has remained unchanged since then, even during and after the 1959 Cuban Revolution, which established the present-day communist state of the Republic of Cuba.

In 2019 Cuba introduced the controversial "National Symbols Bill", which according to official press releases "would establish more flexible use of these items with a view toward promoting their greater presence in society, within a legally defined, respectful framework". Among the tenets that came with the bill was that the flag could be used "as a means of publicity only when the messages would contribute to the promotion and development of patriotic values in people and form a patriotic awareness of respect and veneration for them and the historical tradition of the nation".

In August 2019 independent artists launched the "#" campaign after repressive measures taken in response by the Cuban government, including the arrest of artist Luis Manuel Otero Alcántara. The artists, members of the San Isidro Movement, published a manifesto in which they advocated freer usage of Cuban national symbols, asking the public for assistance in opposing the Cuban government's attempts to restrict usage of the flag.

Subsequent use
In April 1869, López's flag was designated the national banner by the Congress of the Republic of Cuba. López's flag was the model for the flag of Puerto Rico adopted in 1892 by the Puerto Rican Revolutionary Committee, a pro-independence group that worked under the auspices of the Cuban Revolutionary Party.

After the United States seized Cuba from Spain during the Spanish–American War, the U.S. flag flew from January 1, 1899, until independence was granted. On May 20, 1902, the Cuban national flag was hoisted as a symbol of independence and sovereignty. It has been used ever since, remaining unchanged after the Cuban Revolution of 1959. During the revolution, Cuban president Fidel Castro's 26th of July Movement created a party flag equally divided in red and black like the Angolan national flag usually in horizontal stripes and often with inscriptions, which is often flown on public buildings.

Specifications

The Cuban flag is at a length-to-width ratio of 2:1. The blue and white alternating stripes are of equal width. The red chevron is in the shape of an equilateral triangle that does not extend to the middle of the flag. The star within the chevron has a diameter that is  the length of the hoist. Its middle is halfway up the flag.

Historical versions of the flag

See also
 List of Cuban flags
 Coat of arms of Cuba
 Cuban trogon, national bird of Cuba

References

External links

 
 Cuba Flags—A historical insight into the flag and emblems of Cuba
 The Flag of Cuba on flagscorner.com

1848 introductions
Cuba
National symbols of Cuba